The title of Baron Musgrave was created once in the Peerage of England. On 25 November 1350 Thomas Musgrave was summoned to parliament. He was imprisoned in 1381/2, when '[t]he Barony was possibly considered as forfeited'.  He died after 1382.

Baron Musgrave (1350)
Thomas Musgrave, 1st Baron Musgrave (d. a. 1382) (forfeit? 1381/2)

References

1350 establishments in England
Baronies in the Peerage of England
Noble titles created in 1350
Musgrave family